Micropolyclithrum is a genus of monogeneans in the family Gyrodactylidae. It consists of one species, Micropolyclithrum parvum Skinner, 1975.

References

Gyrodactylidae
Monogenea genera
Monotypic platyhelminthes genera